Garson Mine is an underground nickel mine located in the community of Garson, within the city of Greater Sudbury, Ontario, Canada.  Garson mine was developed around 1908 by Mond Nickel Company and is owned by Vale Inco.

Garson Ramp Project
Vale Inco has approved a plan to re-open the Garson Ramp.  The project is in the development phase and will cost $30 million.  The Garson Ramp project will involve three ore bodies and produce 500 tonnes of ore per day.

Ground Conditions 
The ground conditions at Garson Mine are dangerous and unstable. Workers have lost their lives due to unstable ground conditions at Garson Mine and these conditions continue to be a problem for operations. A rock burst at the mine left nine workers trapped underground for several hours on January 23, 2007, although they were rescued with no injuries.

The unsafe ground conditions at Garson Mine are caused from a combination of variables, the two most prominent being that the mine is on a dyke and aquifer.

Safety 
In 2005 Garson Mine won the CIM's National John T. Ryan Trophy for Metal Mines.  This award is given to the metal mine which has the lowest accident frequency in the country.

See also
List of mines in Ontario

References

Mines in Greater Sudbury
Nickel mines in Canada
Underground mines in Canada